The Grand Rapids Eastern Railroad  is a railroad in western Michigan,  United States. The line runs east–west through Grand Rapids, Michigan to Lowell. Its  of trackage ends at the Saint Mary's Siding, where it meets the Coopersville and Marne Railway. It interchanges with CSX Transportation and the Grand Elk Railroad at Grand Rapids. It was established in 1993 and purchased by RailAmerica in 2000. The railroad was later acquired by Genesee & Wyoming Inc. as part of its acquisition of RailAmerica in late 2012.

Most of the railroad's traffic comes from grain, lumber, and sodium carbonate. The GR hauled around 1,250 carloads in 2008.

References

External links

 Grand Rapids Eastern Railroad official webpage - Genesee and Wyoming website

Michigan railroads
RailAmerica
Railway companies established in 1993